Daniel James Stratford (born 29 May 1985) is an English former footballer who played as a midfielder and current head coach of the West Virginia Mountaineers men's soccer team. He returned to his alma mater after three seasons as assistant coach and three seasons as head coach of the University of Charleston  Golden Eagles and leading his team to the NCAA Division II Men's Soccer Championship in 2017 and 2019.

During his playing career he played professionally for D.C. United, Inverness Caledonian Thistle and Hereford United.

Career

Born in London, Stratford began his career playing for the youth academy at Fulham in England, eventually graduating to their reserve side. He then played in the NCAA Division I for college side West Virginia University. He attended Wilson's School until 2003.

At West Virginia he would finish his career as the all-time leader in assists (27) and most matches played (85). During his college career Stratford also played for the Cape Cod Crusaders in the USL Premier Development League.

He was drafted by D.C. United with the 24th overall pick in the 2008 MLS Supplemental Draft on 24 January 2008. He made his debut as a sub against the Kansas City Wizards on 29 March 2008 in D.C.'s season opener and got his first start on 26 April 2008 in a 4–1 victory over Real Salt Lake.

Stratford was waived by D.C. United on 15 August 2008. He joined Scottish side Inverness Caledonian Thistle, following a successful trial on 23 July 2009. Stratford was released by Inverness Caledonian Thistle on 6 May 2010.

Following a successful trial period he signed a one-year deal at Hereford United on 16 July. He left at the end of the season after finding first team opportunities rare.

Stratford was appointed as men's team coach for the University of Charleston in January 2017. He had been on the coaching staff for two years following a two-year spell as assistant at West Virginia.

References

External links

Living people
1985 births
Footballers from Greater London
English footballers
Major League Soccer players
West Virginia Mountaineers men's soccer players
D.C. United players
Inverness Caledonian Thistle F.C. players
Hereford United F.C. players
Cape Cod Crusaders players
USL League Two players
Scottish Football League players
English Football League players
D.C. United draft picks
Association football midfielders
English expatriate sportspeople in the United States
Expatriate soccer players in the United States
English expatriate footballers
West Virginia Mountaineers men's soccer coaches
English expatriate football managers
Expatriate soccer managers in the United States
Charleston Golden Eagles men's soccer coaches
Association football coaches